The St. John's Church in Payette, Idaho was built in 1911. It was listed on the National Register of Historic Places in 2013. It has also been known as the German Evangelical Lutheran Church.

References

National Register of Historic Places in Payette County, Idaho
Gothic Revival architecture in Idaho
Buildings and structures completed in 1911
German-American culture in Idaho